Bam University of Medical Sciences is a medical sciences university in Bam, Kerman, Iran. The university has three school including medicine, health, and nursing & midwifery.

References

External links
Official website

Bam County
Medical schools in Iran